Baliwag or Baliuag, officially the City of Baliwag, is a 1st class component city in the province of Bulacan, Philippines. According to the 2020 census, it has a population of 168,470 people.

Baliuag was founded in 1732 by Augustinian friars and was incorporated by the Spanish Governor-General on May 26, 1733. The city was a part of Quingua (now Plaridel) before.

Through the years of Spanish domination, Baliuag was predominantly agricultural. People had to depend on rice farming for the main source of livelihood. Orchards and tumanas yielded fruits and vegetables, which were sold in the public market. Commerce and industry also played important contributions to the economy of the people. Buntal hat weaving in Baliwag together with silk weaving popularly known in the world as Thai silk; the manufacturer of cigar cases, piña fibers, petates (mats), and Sillas de Bejucos (cane chairs) all of the fine quality became known in many parts of the world. The local market also grew. During the early part of the 19th century, Baliwag was already considered one of the most progressive and richest towns in Bulacan. The growth of the public market has significantly changed the model of the economy of the city.

Baliwag is the major commerce, transportation, entertainment, and educational center of Northern Bulacan. With the continuous expansion of Metro Manila, the city is now included in the Greater Manila's built-up conurbation area which reaches San Ildefonso, Bulacan at its northernmost part.

On July 22, 2022, Republic Act No. 11929 lapsed into law. The said measure will convert the municipality into a component city and standardize its name as the City of Baliwag.  On December 17, 2022, a plebiscite was held, 17,814 residents voted in favor of conversion to a component city while only 5,702 voted against.

History
Fr. Joaquín Martínez de Zúñiga, OSA, a friar, in his "1803 Historia de las Islas Filipinas" wrote that the Convent or Parochial house of San Agustin, in Baliuag, is the best in the whole Archipelago and that no edifice in Manila can be compared to it in symmetry and beauty amid its towering belfry, having been a viewing point of the town's panorama. The frayle further stated that the Convent was a repository of priceless parish records that dated to the founding of Baliuag as a pueblo or parrochia by the OSA or Augustinians in 1733.  But the first convent was erected at Barangay Santa Barbara, Baliuag before the Parokya was formally established at the now Plaza Naning, Poblacion.

Fr. Joaquín Martínez de Zúñiga arrived in the Philippines on August 3, 1786, and visited Baliuag on February 17, 1802, with Ignacio Maria de Álava y Sáenz de Navarrete. Their host was Baliuag's Parish Priest, Fray Esteban Diez Hidalgo. Fr. Diez served as the longest cura parroco of Baliuag from 1789, having built the church and convent from 1790 to 1801.

Spanish records "Apuntes históricos de la provincia augustiniana del Santísimo Nombre de Jesús de Filipinas" reveal that Fr. Juan de Albarran, OSA was assigned Parish Priest of Baliuag in 1733. The first baptism in Baliuag Church was ordered by Fr. Lector and Fr. Feliz Trillo, Provincial of the Province on June 7, 1933, while Baliuag was founded and began its de jure existence on May 26, 1733. The pueblo or town was created in the provincial Chapter on May 15, 1734, with the appointment of Fr. Manuel Bazeta/Baseta as first cura parroco.

In 1769–1774, the Church of Baliuag was built by Father Gregorio Giner. The present structure (the third church to be rebuilt, due to considerable damage during the 1880 Luzon earthquakes) was later rebuilt by Father Esteban Diaz using mortar and stone. The 1866 Belfry was also completed by Father Matias Novoa but the July 19, 1880, quake damaged the same which was later repaired by Father Thomas Gresa.

The earthquake of June 3, 1863, one of the strongest to ever hit Manila, destroyed the Governor's Palace in Intramuros. Malacañang then became the permanent residence of the head of the country. The massive quake also damaged the Baliuag Church.  In 1870, the reconstruction began when a temporary house of worship,  the “Provincial”, along Año 1733 street, emerged as a narrow, and simple edifice which later used by the RVM Sisters of the Colegio de la Sagrada Familia (now St. Mary's College of Baliuag) as the classroom. Antonio de Mesa, “Maestrong Tonio" fabricated the parts to have finished the Spanish-era Baliuag Church.

First Municipio
Baliuag had 30 curates (1733–1898): Fr. Esteban Diez Hidalgo and Fr. Fausto Lopez served 40 and 24 years, respectively. Fr. Lopez had 6 children with a beautiful native, Mariquita: Dr. Joaquin Gonzalez, Francisco, the former Assemblyman Ricardo Lloret Gonzales (Legislative districts of Bulacan, 5th Philippine Legislature), and Jose the eldest who was widely known as “Pepeng Mariquita", inter alia. Spanish cura parroco, Fr. Ysidoro Prada served in Baliuag during the last decade of the Spaniard regime.

The Philippine-American civil and military authorities supervised the first municipal elections, having chosen Baliuag as the site of the first Philippine elections of May 7, 1899. The Filipinos gathered at the plaza of the St. Augustine Church after the Holy Mass, and thereafter the officials were selected based on the qualifications for voters set by the Americans.

The first town Gobernadorcillo (1789 title) of Baliuag was Cap. Jose de Guzman. He was assisted by the Tribunal's teniente mayor (chief lieutenant), juez de ganadas (judge of the cattle), juez de sementeras (judge of the field) and juez de policia (judge of the police). In the History of the Philippines (1521–1898), the 1893 Maura Law,  the title of Gobernadorcillo became "capitan municipal" and that of each juez to teniente. From Baliuag's independence from Quingua, now Plaridel, Bulacan to 1898, 49 served as capitan, 13 alcalde and 92 as Gobernadorcillo.  Felix de Lara (1782) and Agustin de Castro (1789) were the 1st alcalde and Gobernadorcillo, respectively. Municipal President Fernando Enrile, in 1908, honored some of these officials, even naming some of Baliuag calles in their honor, later. But all these political officials remained under the thumbs and the habito, of the autocratic Augustinian friars, the Baliuag Kura Parokos.

The local government of Baliuag used as first Municipio under the American regime (History of the Philippines (1898–1946)) the Mariano Yoyongko (Gobernadorcillo in 1885) Principalia in Poblacion (now a part of the market site), which it bought from Yoyongko.

On September 15, 1915, Baliuag municipality bought the heritage mansion and a lot of Dr. Joaquin Gonzalez. The Gonzalez old mansion served as Lumang Municipio (the Old Municipio or Town Hall Building, as the seat of the local government) for 65 years. It is now the Baliuag Museum and Library.

Baliuag produced not less than 30 priests, including 3 during the Spanish-Dominican, and 2 Jesuits during the American regimes.

Jeorge Allan R. Tengco and Amy R. Tengco (wife of Lito S. Tengco), philanthropists, owners of Baliwag Transit and other chains of business establishments had been conferred the Papal Orders of Chivalry October 3, 2000 Pro Ecclesia et Pontifice and the 2012 Dame of the Order of St. Gregory the Great awards.

Don Mariano Ponce

Mariano Ponce was a native of Baliuag. He was a founding member of the Propaganda Movement together with José Rizal and Marcelo del Pilar; a former assemblyman of the second district of Bulacan to the Philippine Assembly; and the co-founder of La Solidaridad with fellow co-founder Graciano López-Jaena. His most common names are Naning (the Plaza Naning in Baliuag being named after his nickname); Kalipulako, named after the Cebuano hero Lapulapu; and Tagibalang or Tigbalang (Tikbalang), a supernatural being in Filipino folklore.

Cityhood

In 2018, the Sangguniang Bayan filed a resolution to request Bulacan 2nd District Representative Gavini Pancho, to file a house bill to convert Baliuag into a city.

ACT-CIS Partylist Representative Eric Go Yap and 1st District of Davao City Representative Paolo Duterte filed House Bill 7362, seeking to convert Baliuag into a city in the province. House Bill No. 7362 was filed last August 12, 2020, for the conversion of the municipality of Baliuag into a component city in the province of Bulacan. 

House Bill No. 10444 was concurred by the Senate and submitted to the President for signature on June 29, 2022, a day before the end of the 18th Congress.

The bill lapsed into law on July 30, 2022, as Republic Act No. 11929. The plebiscite was originally set by the Commission on Elections on January 14, 2023, but its date was later moved to December 17, 2022, following the postponement of the December 2022 Barangay and Sangguniang Kabataan Elections to 2023.

Despite having a low voter turnout, majority of participated voters ratified the cityhood, making Baliwag the Bulacan's fourth component city and the country's 148th.

Geography

Barangays
Baliwag is politically subdivided into 27 barangays.

Climate

Demographics

Religion
Baliwag at present has six parishes, a sub-parish and a quasi-parish under the administration of Diocese of Malolos. Their patron saint of Baliwag is St. Augustine because Baliwag was founded by the Augustinians in 1733.

Economy

Major industries
 Garments
 Pyrotechnics
 Food/Food Processing
 Furniture
 Swine
 Chicken Production
 Automobile Industry

Major products
 Buntal Hat and Bags
 Bakeries (Native Pandesal, Ensaymada, Spanish Bread)
 Native Delicacies (Chicharon, Puto, Pastillas de Leche)
 Lechon Manok (famously Baliwag Lechon Manok)

Malls and supermarkets
 SM City Baliwag
 A Square
 Puregold Baliwag
 Puregold DRT Highway
 Puregold Tangos
 Super8 Grocery Warehouse
 Savemore Supermarket
 Ultra Mega Supermarket
 Unitop Baliwag
 Megamart Baliwag
RCS
 Waltermart Mall Baliwag (U/C) 
 NSN (U/C)

Government

List of former mayors

City seal
According to Republic Act No. 11929, the official seal of the city shall be circular in form with the dominant colors of green and blue representing the city's vision to promote economic and social progress, sustainable development, and technological advancement. The year 2022 at the center upper part of the official
seal indicates the year that Baliwag became a component City. The building structure represents the facade of the town’s seat of government. On top of this image is the year 1733, when Baliwag was founded by the Augustinians. The official seal shall display rice stalks to indicate that the City of Baliwag maintains its commitment to national food security as one of the top rice yielders in the Province of Bulacan. The Baliwag buntal hat, a product woven in this City and is regarded as superior in quality to other types of buntal hats produced in the country, is likewise depicted in the official seal. The City of Baliwag may alter its official seal, provided that any change of the seal shall be approved by Congress and registered with the Department of the Interior and Local Government (DILG).

Tourism

Baliwag Clock TowerBaliwag is the home of the first self-supporting clock tower in Bulacan, which is a heritage attraction in the city.

Lenten ProcessionsBaliwag is known for its Semana Santa (Holy Week) processions, which are among the longest religious processions in the Philippines. As of 2019, the procession hosts a record 124 (121, with 3 additional) carros or carrozas (floats) with life-sized santos (statues) joined in the parade showcasing events from the life and passion of Christ.

Buntal Hat Festival 
Buntal Hat Festival is a celebration of the culture of buntal hat making in the city that is simultaneously celebrated with Mother's Day annually. Early versions of the buntal hat were wide-brimmed farmer's hats and used unsoftened strips of buntal fiber. The industry expanded into Baliwag, Bulacan between 1907 and 1909, originally introduced by Mariano Deveza who originally hailed from Lucban, Quezon. Colorful and grandiose decorations and street dancing are the highlights of this celebration.

Other attractions
 3006 Augustine Square (A. Square)
 Baliwag Glorietta Park
 Baliwag Museum and Library (Lumang Municipio)
 Mariano Ponce Ancestral House Museum
 The Greenery Events Place
 The Baliwag Star Arena
 Jose Rizal Monument at Plaza Naning
 Baliwag Pasalubong Center
 Parish Museum of Old Religious Artifacts (Parish of St. Augustine)
 Carozza Makers
 Artisan Street (Bone In-Lay Handicrafts)
 Baliwag Heroes’ Park
 Baliwag Night Market
 Baliwag Christmas Night Market
 The Chapters
Tate Haus, Baliwag's Premiere Resort.

Transportation

Public transportation in Baliwag is served by provincial buses, jeepneys, UV Express AUVs, and intra-municipal tricycles.

Baliwag Transit, Inc., one of the largest bus transportation system in the Philippines, is headquartered in Barangay Sabang. It mainly services routes to and from Metro Manila and Central Luzon.

There are three major transport lines in the municipality: The Baliwag-Candaba (Benigno S. Aquino Avenue) road going to Pampanga (from the Downtown Baliwag to Candaba Town Proper), the Old Cagayan Valley road (Calle Rizal) and the Dona Remedios Trinidad Highway (N1, AH26) going to Manila and Nueva Ecija. The city is located 52 kilometers north of Manila, the capital of the Philippines.

Education
There are public and private educational institutions found in Baliwag.

Tertiary education
Baliuag University – is the first school granted full autonomy in Region III by the Commission on Higher Education (CHED) in 2001. 
Baliuag Polytechnic College – is a public tertiary and vocational education institution in Baliwag. 
Fernandez College of Arts and Technology 
St. Mary's College of Baliuag – is a co-ed (mixed-sex) Catholic school founded in 1912 and administered by the Religious of the Virgin Mary, the first pontifically approved congregation for women in the Philippines.
STI College 
ACLC
Marian College Of Baliwag
National University Bulacan - SM City Baliwag

Primary and secondary education
Here are some of the school's offers between primary and secondary education;

Public
Mariano Ponce National High School
Sto. Niño High School
Virgen Delas Flores High School
Sulivan High School
Teodoro Evangelista Memorial High School (a school between Baliwag and Bustos)
Tilapayong Elementary School
San Jose Elementary School
Concepcion Elementary School
Sabang Elementary School
Baliwag North Central School
Baliwag South Central School
Catulinan Elementary School
Pinagbarilan Elementary School
Hinukay Elementary School

Private
Immaculate Concepcion School of Baliwag
Montessori De Sagrada Familia
Living Angels Christian Academy
Saint Jean Baptiste Academy Inc
The Catholic Servants of Christ Community

Gallery

See also

 Good Friday processions in Baliwag
 Saint Augustine Parish Church (Baliwag)
 Baliuag Museum and Library
 Sub-Parish Church of Santo Cristo
 Lady of Most Holy Rosary Parish Church
 Fernandez College of Arts and Technology
 Baliuag University
 St. Mary's College of Baliuag
 Baliwag Transit
 SM City Baliwag
 Dr. Joaquin Gonzalez

References

External links

Local Government Unit: Municipality of Baliwag
Baliwag Bulacan
 [ Philippine Standard Geographic Code]
Philippine Census Information
Baliwag Official Site
 BALIWAG-eBOOK, a five volume history of Baliwag: Volumes I II III IV V, ''Baliwag Society International

Component cities in the Philippines